

Peerage of England

|rowspan=2|Earl of Cornwall (1068)||Robert, Count of Mortain||1068||1095||Died
|-
|William Fitz-Robert, 2nd Earl of Cornwall||1095||1106|| 
|-
|Earl of Dorset (1070)||Osmund, Count of Seez||1070||1099||Died
|-
|Earl of Chester (1071)||Hugh d'Avranches, 1st Earl of Chester||1071||1101|| 
|-
|rowspan=3|Earl of Shrewsbury (1074)||Roger de Montgomerie, 1st Earl of Shrewsbury||1074||1094||Died
|-
|Hugh of Montgomery, 2nd Earl of Shrewsbury||1094||1098||Died
|-
|Robert of Bellême, 3rd Earl of Shrewsbury||1098||1102|| 
|-
|Earl of Northampton (1080)||Simon I de Senlis, Earl of Huntingdon-Northampton||1080||1109|| 
|-
|rowspan=2|Earl of Albemarle (1081)||Adelaide, 1st Countess of Albemarle||1081||1090||Died
|-
|Stephen de Blois, 2nd Earl of Albemarle||1090||1127|| 
|-
|rowspan=2|Earl of Surrey (1088)||William de Warenne, 1st Earl of Surrey||1088||1099||Died
|-
|William de Warenne, 2nd Earl of Surrey||1099||1138|| 
|-
|Earl of Warwick (1088)||Henry de Beaumont, 1st Earl of Warwick||1088||1119|| 
|-
|Earl of Gloucester (1093)||William Fitzeustace, 1st Earl of Gloucester||1093||1094||New creation; Died
|-
|Earl of Buckingham (1097)||Walter Giffard, 1st Earl of Buckingham||1097||1102||New creation

Peerage of Scotland

|Mormaer of Fife||Causantín, Earl of Fife||c. 1095||1128||
|-
|Mormaer of Mearns||Máel Petair of Mearns|| || ||fl. 1094

References

Lists of peers by decade
1090s in England
11th century in Scotland
 
11th-century mormaers
Peers